Michael F. Stelzer (born February 11, 1964 in St. Louis) is a circuit judge from Missouri.  He attended Augustana College and Saint Louis University School of Law.  Stelzer was appointed to the associate circuit bench in January 2004 by Missouri Governor Bob Holden.

Judge Stelzer made national news in 2019 in keeping Missouri's last abortion clinic open.  This prevented Missouri from being the first state to not have an abortion clinic since Roe v. Wade was decided in 1973.

References

Living people
1964 births
21st-century American judges
Augustana College (Illinois) alumni
Saint Louis University School of Law alumni